Nazar Muhammad Rashed , (1 August 1910 – 9 October 1975) commonly known as Noon Meem Rashed or N.M. Rashed, was a Pakistani poet of modern Urdu poetry.

Early years
Rashed was born as Nazar Muhammad in a Janjua family in the village of Kot Bhaaga, Akaal Garh (now Alipur Chatha), Wazirabad,  Gujranwala District, Punjab, and earned a master's degree in economics from the Government College Lahore.

Career
He served for a short time in the Royal Indian Army during the Second World War, attaining the rank of captain. Before independence of Pakistan in 1947, he worked with All India Radio in New Delhi and Lucknow starting in 1942. He was transferred to Peshawar in 1947 where he worked until 1953. Later he was hired by Voice of America and had to move to New York City for this job. Then, for a short while, he lived in Iran. Later on, he worked for the United Nations in New York.

Rashed served the UN and worked in many countries. He is considered to be the 'father of Modernism' in Urdu Literature. Along with Faiz Ahmed Faiz, he is one of the great progressive poets in Pakistani literature.

His readership is limited and recent social changes have further hurt his stature and there seems to be a concerted effort to not to promote his poetry. His first book of free verse, Mavra, was published in 1940 and established him as a pioneering figure in 'free form' Urdu poetry.

He retired to England in 1973 and died in a London hospital in 1975.

Bollywood
His poem "Zindagi sey dartey ho" was set to music in the 2010 Bollywood movie, Peepli Live. It was performed by the Indian music band, Indian Ocean, and received critical appreciation as "hard-hitting" and "a gem of a track" that "everyone is meant to sing, and mean, at some point in life".

Bibliography
 Mavraa (Beyond)-1940
 Iran Main Ajnabi (A stranger in Iran)
 La = Insaan (Nothingness = Man)- 1969
 Gumaan ka Mumkin (Speculations) was published after his death in 1976 
 Maqalat (Essays)- Ed. Shima Majeed, 2002.

College hall named after him
At Government College Lahore., a hall is named after him as "Noon Meem Rashid Hall" at Postgraduate Block Basement.

References

External links

 Selected Poetry of N.M. Rashid Translated in English
 Kuliyat e Noon Meem Rashid

1910 births
1975 deaths
Punjabi people
People from Wazirabad
Pakistani poets
Urdu-language poets from Pakistan
Government College University, Lahore alumni
People from British India
20th-century poets
Sonneteers